Queen Charlton is a small village within the civil parish of Compton Dando, within the Unitary Authority of Bath and North East Somerset in Somerset, England.

The village was originally simply Charlton, recorded in 1291 as Cherleton.  It was an estate of Keynsham Abbey until the Dissolution, and the prefix was added when the estate was given by Henry VIII to Queen Catherine Parr.

The Church of St Margaret dates from the 12th century. It has been designated by English Heritage as a Grade II* listed building. There is a late medieval cross on the village green.

Notable residents 
The author Dick King-Smith lived in Queen Charlton until his death in 2011.

References

Villages in Bath and North East Somerset